Bancroft is a British television thriller series that began airing on ITV on 11 December 2017 and concluded on 14 December 2017. The series was produced by Tall Story Pictures for ITV, and distributed worldwide by ITV Studios Global Entertainment. It was created and written by Kate Brooke. A second series was broadcast from 1 January 2020 to 3 January 2020. On 3 November ITV cancelled Bancroft after two series.

Synopsis
Detective Superintendent Elizabeth Bancroft (Parish) finds out her colleague, DS Katherine Stevens (Marsay) was given a cold case to solve who really killed Laura Fraser (Sacofsky) back in 1990. The investigation ties back into Bancroft's own dark past.

Cast

Main cast
 Sarah Parish as Detective Superintendent / Detective Chief Superintendent Elizabeth Bancroft
 Adam Long as Joe Bancroft
 Adrian Edmondson as Superintendent Clifford Walker
 Lee Boardman as Detective Inspector George Morris
 Charles Babalola as Detective Sergeant Andy Bevan
 Ryan McKen as Danesh Kamara
 Shameem Ahmad as Naila Kamara

Series 1 (2017)
 Faye Marsay as Detective Sergeant Katherine Stevens
 Amara Karan as Dr. Anya Karim
 Art Malik as Chief Superintendent Alan Taheeri
 Linus Roache as Tim Fraser
 Lily Sacofsky as Laura Fraser
 Anjli Mohindra as Zaheera Kamara

Series 2 (2020)
 David Avery as Detective Superintendent Jake Harper
 Jacqueline Boatswain as Chief Constable Frances Holland
 James Quinn as Detective Sergeant Richard Potter
 Yemisi Oyinloye as Detective Constable Sally Reed
 Charlotte Hope as Annabel Connors

Episodes

Series Overview

Series 1 (2017)

Series 2 (2020)

References

External links 

2017 British television series debuts
2020 British television series endings
2010s British crime drama television series
2010s British mystery television series
2010s British workplace drama television series
2020s British crime drama television series
2020s British mystery television series
2020s British workplace drama television series
British detective television series
British thriller television series
English-language television shows
ITV crime dramas
Television series by ITV Studios
Television shows set in Greater Manchester